Parakkadavu (English: The ferry of rock) is a village situated along the banks of the Chalakkudi river in Ernakulam district in the Indian state of Kerala. Local paddy fields are fed by the Chalakkudi river. Parakkadavu is a Grama panchayath and a Block panchayath. Moozhikkulam Lakshmana Temple is just a walkable distance from Parakkadavu junction.

Demographics
 India census, Parakkadavu had a population of 29997 with 14923 males and 15074 females.

References

Villages in Ernakulam district